An isthmus is a narrow piece of land connecting two larger areas across an expanse of water by which they are otherwise separated. A tombolo is an isthmus that consists of a spit or bar, and a strait is the sea counterpart of an isthmus, being a narrow stretch of sea between two landmasses that connects two larger bodies of water.

Isthmus vs land bridge vs peninsula

Isthmus and land bridge are related terms, with isthmus having a broader meaning. A land bridge is an isthmus connecting Earth's major landmasses. The term land bridge is usually used in biogeology to describe land connections that used to exist between continents at various times and were important for migration of people and various species of animals and plants, e.g. Beringia and Doggerland.

An isthmus is a land connection between two bigger landmasses, while a peninsula is rather a land protrusion which is connected to a bigger landmass on one side only and surrounded by water on all other sides. Technically, an isthmus can have canals running from coast to coast (e.g. the Panama Canal), and thus resemble two peninsulas; however, canals are artificial features distinguished from straits.

Major isthmuses

The world's major isthmuses include the Isthmus of Panama and the Isthmus of Tehuantepec in the Middle America, the Kra Isthmus on Mainland Southeast Asia, the Isthmus of Suez between North Africa and Western Asia, and the Karelian Isthmus in Europe. Of historic importance were the Isthmus of Corinth in Greece and the Isthmus of Catanzaro in Italy.

Canals
Canals are often built across isthmuses, where they may be a particularly advantageous shortcut for marine transport. For example, the Panama Canal crosses the Isthmus of Panama, connecting the North Atlantic and Pacific Oceans; the Suez Canal connects the Mediterranean Sea and the Red Sea, cutting across the western side of the Isthmus of Suez, formed by the Sinai Peninsula; and the Crinan Canal crosses the isthmus between Loch Crinan and Loch Gilp, which connects the Kintyre peninsula with the rest of Scotland. Another example is the Welland Canal in the Niagara Peninsula (technically an isthmus). It connects Lake Ontario to Lake Erie. The city of Auckland on the North Island of New Zealand is situated on an isthmus.

See also

Notes